Elections for Redbridge London Borough Council were held on 6 May 2010.  The 2010 General Election and other local elections took place on the same day.

In London council elections the entire council is elected every four years, as opposed to some local elections where one councillor is elected every year for three of the four years.

Summary of results

Turnout: 62.41% (+24.01% since the last local election)
Total Votes: 347,419

Group Leadership, mayoralty and Cabinet
Conservative Party: Keith Prince (Barkingside, Conservative Leader, Leader of the Council & Cabinet Member for Finance)
Liberal Democrats: Ian Bond (Roding, LibDem Leader, Deputy Leader of the Council and Cabinet Member for Resources)
Labour Party: Jas Athwal (Mayfield, Labour Leader)
Redbridge Independent Group:  Filly Maravala (Loxford, Independent Leader)
Mayor: Felicity Banks (Roding, LibDem)
Deputy Major: Tania Solomon (Barkingside, Conservative)
Cabinet Member for Highways, Environment & Crime: Shoaib Patel (Valentines, LibDem)
Cabinet Member for Adult Social Services and Health: John Fairley-Churchill (Bridge, Conservative)
Cabinet Member for Regeneration, Business & Communities: Thomas Chan (Wanstead, Conservative)
Cabinet Member for Leisure & Youth Services: Ashok Kumar (Cranbrook, Conservative)
Cabinet Member for Planning & Public Protection: Alex Wilson (Wanstead, Conservative)
Cabinet Member for Housing: Michelle Dunn (Wanstead, Conservative)
Cabinet Member for Children's Services: Alan Weinberg (Clayhall, Conservative)

Ward results
Candidates in italics won the seat for the party at the 2006 Local Elections and have now lost it.

Gary Peter Staight for the Liberal Democrats was elected here in 2006.

Elected as a Labour Party candidate in 2006.

*Elected as a Conservative in 2006.

Labour gain two seats from the Conservative Party.

Liberal Democrat gain a seat from Labour since the 2006 election.

References

2010
2010 London Borough council elections
May 2010 events in the United Kingdom
2006 London Borough council elections